Alucita ancalopa is a moth of the family Alucitidae. It is found in Brazil and French Guiana.

References

Moths described in 1922
Alucitidae
Moths of South America
Taxa named by Edward Meyrick